The 2012–13 Welsh League Cup was the 21st season of the Welsh League Cup, which was established in 1992. A new format was introduced with eight feeder league clubs involved for the first time. The winners progressed into the second round, alongside the twelve Welsh Premier League clubs.

First round

Source: welsh-premier.com

Second round

Source: welsh-premier.com

Third round

Source: welsh-premier.com

Semifinals

Source: welsh-premier.com

Final

External links

2012–13 Welsh League Cup results

Welsh League Cup seasons
League Cup
Wales